Yuracaré (also Yurakaré, Yurakar, Yuracare, Yurucare, Yuracar, Yurakare, Yurujuré, Yurujare) is an endangered language isolate of central Bolivia in  Cochabamba and Beni departments spoken by the Yuracaré people.

Loukotka (1968) reports that Yuracaré is spoken at the sources of the Sécure River, and on the Chapare River and Chimoré River.

Dialects
Two dialects, now extinct:
Western - Mansiño, Oromo
Eastern - Mage, Soloto

Coni, Cuchi, and Enete are possible dialects (Brinton 1891).

Demographics
There are approximately 2,500 speakers. These numbers are in decline as the youngest generation no longer learns the language. (See Language death.)

Documentation
Yuracaré is documented with a grammar based on an old missionary manuscript by de la Cueva (Adam 1893). The language is currently being studied by Rik van Gijn. A Foundation for Endangered Languages grant was awarded for a Yuracaré–Spanish / Spanish–Yuracaré dictionary project in 2005.

Genealogical relations
Suárez (1977) suggests a relationship between Yuracaré and the Mosetenan, Pano–Tacanan, Arawakan, and Chon families. His earlier Macro-Panoan proposal is the same minus Arawakan (Suárez 1969).

Jolkesky (2016) also notes that there are lexical similarities with the Moseten-Tsimane languages.

Grammar
 Verb-initial
 agglutinating
 prefixes, suffixes
 reduplication

Vocabulary
Loukotka (1968) lists the following basic vocabulary items.

{| class="wikitable sortable"
! gloss !! Yuracare
|-
| one || letha
|-
| two || läshie
|-
| three || lívui
|-
| tooth || sansa
|-
| tongue || erume
|-
| hand || té-banau
|-
| woman || señe
|-
| water || záma
|-
| fire || áima
|-
| moon || shúhui
|-
| maize || sil
|-
| jaguar || samo
|-
| house || siba
|}

See also
 Yuracaré

Notes

Bibliography
 Adam, Lucien. (1893). Principes et dictionnaire de la langue Yuracaré ou Yurujuré composés par le R. P. de la Cueva et publiés conformément au manuscrit de A. d’Orbigny. Bibliothèque linguistique américaine (No. 16). Paris: Maisonneuve.
 Adelaar, Willem F. H.; & Muysken, Pieter C. (2004). The Languages of the Andes. Cambridge Language Surveys. Cambridge University Press.
 Campbell, Lyle. (1997). American Indian Languages: The Historical Linguistics of Native America. New York: Oxford University Press. .
 Kaufman, Terrence. (1990). Language History in South America: What We Know and How To Know More. In D. L. Payne (Ed.), Amazonian Linguistics: Studies in Lowland South American languages (pp. 13–67). Austin: University of Texas Press. .
 Kaufman, Terrence. (1994). The Native Languages of South America. In C. Mosley & R. E. Asher (Eds.), Atlas of the World's Languages (pp. 46–76). London: Routledge.
Ribera, J.; Rivero, W.; Rocha, A. (1991). Vocabulario yuracaré-castellano, castellano-yuracaré. Trinidad: MISEREOR.
 Suárez, Jorge. (1969). Moseten and Pano–Tacanan. Anthropological Linguistics, 11 (9), 255-266.
 Suárez, Jorge. (1977). La posición lingüística del pano-tacana y del arahuaco. Anales de Antropología, 14, 243-255.
 van Gijn, Rik. (2004). Number in the Yurakaré Noun Phrase. In L. Cornips & J. Doetjes (Eds.), Linguistics in the Netherlands 2004 (pp. 69–79). Linguistics in the Netherlands (No. 21). John Benjamins.
 van Gijn, Rik (2005). Head Marking and Dependent Marking of Grammatical Relations in Yurakaré. In M. Amberber & H. de Hoop (eds.) Competition and Variation in Natural Languages: The Case for Case. (pp. 41–72) Elsevier.
 van Gijn, Rik (2006) A Grammar of Yurakaré. Ph.D. dissertation Radboud University Nijmegen.

External links

 Proel: Lengua Yurakare
 FEL Grants 2005 (Foundation for Endangered Languages)
 DoBeS : General presentation of the Yurakaré language and people
 Lenguas de Bolivia (online edition)
 Yurakaré DoReCo corpus compiled by Sonja Gipper and Jeremías Ballivián Torrico. Audio recordings of narrative texts, with transcriptions time-aligned at the phone level and translations.

Language isolates of South America
Indigenous languages of the South American Southern Foothills
Languages of Bolivia
Endangered language isolates
Endangered indigenous languages of the Americas
Mamoré–Guaporé linguistic area